Template engine may refer to:
 Template processor, the general concept
 Web template system, contains a web templating engine as one component
 Mail merge, template engines used in word processing applications
 Preprocessor, template engines used in conjunction with a compiler

See also
 Template (disambiguation)
 Engine (disambiguation)